Károly Varga (born 28 September 1955 in Budapest) is a Hungarian sport shooter and Olympic champion. He won a gold medal in the 50 metre rifle prone event at the 1980 Summer Olympics in Moscow.

References

1955 births
Living people
Hungarian male sport shooters
ISSF rifle shooters
Olympic shooters of Hungary
Olympic gold medalists for Hungary
Shooters at the 1980 Summer Olympics
Olympic medalists in shooting

Medalists at the 1980 Summer Olympics
Sport shooters from Budapest
20th-century Hungarian people